Yusof bin Ishak  (12 August 191023 November 1970) was a Singaporean politician who was the first President of Singapore elected by the Parliament of Singapore, serving from 1965 to 1970. 

Before becoming head-of-state, Yusof was a well-known journalist and co-founded Utusan Melayu, which was in circulation till 9 October 2019. He started journalism after he graduated from Raffles Institution in 1929 and in 1932, he joined Warta Malaya, a well-known Malay newspaper company at that time. He left the company in 1938 and co-founded Utusan Melayu.

Yusof held many appointments within the Singaporean government. He served on the Film Appeal Committee from 1948 to 1950 and was also a member of both the Nature Reserves Committee and Malayanisation Commission for a year. In July 1959, he was appointed Chairman of the Public Service Commission, Singapore. He was sworn on 3 December that year as Singapore's Yang di-Pertuan Negara (head of state) after the PAP won the first election held in Singapore after Singapore's self-governance. Yusof then became the first President of Singapore after the country gained independence on 9 August 1965.

Yusof served for three terms in office before he died on 23 November 1970 due to heart failure. His portrait appears on the Singapore Portrait Series currency notes introduced in 1999.

Biography

Early life

Born on 12 August 1910 in Kampung Padang Gajah, Terong, Taiping, Perak Darul Ridzuan, which was then part of the Federated Malay States (present day Malaysia), Yusof was the eldest son in a family of nine. He was of Minangkabau descent from his father's side while his mother was a Malay from the Langkat region in Indonesia. His father, Ishak bin Ahmad, was also a civil servant and held the post of Acting Director of Fisheries, Straits Settlements and Federated Malay States. His brother, Aziz Ishak, was a Malayan journalist and freedom fighter.

Yusof received his early education in a Malay school in Kuala Kurau, Perak and began his English studies in 1921 at King Edward VII School in Taiping, He was then admitted to Victoria Bridge School in 1923 when his father was posted to Singapore. In 1924, he was enrolled in Raffles Institution for his secondary education. During his time in Raffles Institution, he played various sports such as swimming, weight lifting, water-polo, boxing, hockey and cricket and had also represented the school in various sporting events. He was also part of the Singapore National Cadet Corps and was commissioned as the first ever cadet officer in the Corps due to his outstanding performance. Yusof received his Cambridge School Certificate with distinction in 1927, he was also awarded the Queen's Scholarship and decided to prolong his studies at Raffles Institution until 1929.

Journalism career
After graduating from Raffles Institution in 1929, Yusof began his career as a journalist and went into partnership with two other friends to publish, Sportsman, a sports magazine devoted entirely to sports. In 1932, Yusof joined Warta Malaya, a well-known newspaper during that time. Warta Malaya was heavily influenced by developments in the Middle East and Yusof wanted a newspaper dedicated to Malay issues. He fulfilled his vision by establishing Utusan Melayu with several Malay leaders in Singapore in May 1939.

During the Japanese Occupation of Singapore, Utusan Melayu had to stop circulation as machinery used to print the paper were requisitioned to publish the Japanese paper, Berita Malai. Yusof then moved back to Taiping and with the remaining money he had, he opened a provision shop and lived there until the war ended in 1945 and Utusan Melayu resumed publication. In 1957, Yusof moved to Kuala Lumpur and in February 1958, the headquarters of Utusan Melayu was also relocated to the city. During the post-war period, many Malays wanted independence of Malaya from the British and Yusof, fanned this fervour through his publications which resulted in the formation of the United Malay Nationalist Organisation (UMNO) in 1946. However, his democratic ideals were different from UMNO's vision of reestablishing the monarchy of Malaya. This resulted in rising tensions within the Utusan Melayu and in 1959, Yusof had sold his shares he had in the company and resigned as UMNO had bought over almost all of the shares of Utusan Melayu.

Political career and presidency
Yusof held several appointments within the Singaporean government, he had served on the Film Appeal Committee from 1948 to 1950 and was also a member of both the Nature Reserves Committee and Malayanisation Commission for a year. After his resignation from  Utusan Melayu, Yusof took the position of Chairman of the Public Service Commission of Singapore at the invitation of then Prime Minister Lee Kuan Yew.

After PAP's victory from the 1959 Singaporean elections, Yusof was appointed as Yang di-Pertuan Negara and was sworn on 3 December 1959. During his time as Yang di-Pertuan Negara, Singapore was divided by racial conflicts. Yusof actively promoted multiculturalism and reached out to people of all races to help restore trust and confidence after the 1964 racial riots.

On 9 August 1965, Singapore was expelled from Malaysia and became an independent nation. The position of Yang di-Pertuan Negara was abolished and Yusof then became the first President of Singapore. As president, Yusof reached out to the people to reassure citizens astonished by Singapore's expulsion and continued to promote multiculturalism and a national identity within the country by visiting constituencies and reached out to different racial and religious groups.

Yusof served for three terms in office before he died on 23 November 1970 due to heart failure.

Family and personal life
Yusof is survived by his wife of 21 years, Puan Noor Aishah, and their three children, Orkid Kamariah, Imran, and Zuriana. Puan Noor Aishah continued her husband's legacy of public service and was the first Asian to become president of the Singapore Girl Guides Association. She and her now adult children were interviewed for the Channel NewsAsia documentary Daughters of Singapore, which screened in August 2015 as part of the SG50 celebrations and commemorated the spouses of Yusof Ishak and David Marshall, two pioneer leaders of Singapore.

Yusof participated in several sports in his youth. He won the Aw Boon Par Cup for boxing in 1932, and was the national lightweight champion in weightlifting in 1933. One of Yusof's hobbies was photography, and a collection of his photographs was donated to the National Archives of Singapore by his widow, Noor Aishah. He also cultivated orchids, and had the tennis courts at his residence on the Istana grounds, Sri Melati, converted into an orchid garden. He performed the pilgrimage to Mecca in 1963.

Legacy

The following institutions bear Yusof Ishak's name:

Yusof Ishak Secondary School, opened by then-Prime Minister Lee Kuan Yew on 29 July 1966.
The Institute of Southeast Asian Studies (ISEAS) was officially renamed in August 2015 as the ISEAS–Yusof Ishak Institute on Yusof's 105th birthday, so its name will call to mind Yusof's "vision of equality, justice, harmony and strength amid diversity".
Yusof Ishak House in National University of Singapore's Kent Ridge campus along Lower Kent Ridge Road.
Masjid Yusof Ishak in Woodlands. The opening of this mosque in 2017 was officiated by the former president's widow,  Puan Noor Aishah, and witnessed by guests including Prime Minister Lee Hsien Loong, Minister-in-charge of Muslim Affairs Yaacob Ibrahim, and Mufti Fatris Bakaram.

Other memorials include:
The current series of Singapore dollar notes, the portrait series issued from 1999 onwards, features Yusof Ishak.
In 2014, a wax figure of Yusof was unveiled at Madame Tussauds Singapore.
For the celebration of Singapore's 50th anniversary of independence (SG50) in 2015, Yusof Ishak was featured in all set of six SG50 Commemorative Notes for which he champions the caused of meritocracy, multi-racialism and modernization of Singapore.
Yusof is buried at Kranji State Cemetery, which is reserved for persons who have made a significant contribution to Singapore.

Other legacies

Senior appointments
 Second Lieutenant, National Cadet Corps, 1933–
 Writer, Editor, Rafflesian (Raffles Institution), 1933–
 Founder, Sportsman (Magazine), 1933–
 Managing Director, Accountant, Warta Malaya, 1933–
 Founder, Managing Director, Utusan Melayu (first-ever Malay newspaper), 1939–1959
 Chief, Member, Films Appeal Committee, 1948–1950
 Chief, Member, Nature Reserves Committee, 1948–
 Chief and Patron of the Arts Scene, Malayanisation Commission, Singapore Arts Society, 1948-1950
 Chairman, Public Service Commission (Singapore), July 1959–
 Colonel, Singapore Infantry Regiment, August 1963–
 Chancellor, National University of Singapore, 1965–1970

Opening ceremonies
Yusof Ishak officiated many events including:
 1959 – Announced Singapore's application of membership to the United Nations
 1960 – Declares open to National Carnival, at Raffles Institution
 1960 – Opening Ceremony of Art Exhibition of the Children's Festival, at the Chinese Chamber of Commerce
 1961 – Opening of the Commonwealth Parliamentary Association Regional Conference
 1961 – Opening of the 9th International Bazaar in Aid of the Blind, at Victoria Memorial Hall
 1961 – Opening of The Malay Paintings Exhibition, at Victoria Memorial Hall
 1961 – Opening Ceremony of the Colour Slide Exhibition, at National Library of Singapore

 1961 – Opening of the Grand Prix, at Thomson Road
 1962 – Opening of the Malayan Writers Conference, at Victoria Memorial Hall
 1963 – Declares open to the Fourth Session of Legislative Assembly, at St. Andrew's Road
 1963 – Opening of the 14th annual open exhibition of Singapore Art Society, at Singapore Polytechnic
 1963 – Opening of the Road Safety Photographic Exhibition, at Victoria Memorial Hall
 1963 – Opening of the Second Malaysia Student Photographic Exhibition, at Singapore Polytechnic
 1963 – Opening of the Rotary Conference, at Victoria Memorial Hall
 1963 – Declares open to Orchid Flower Show, at Happy World Stadium
 1964 – Declares open to exhibition of photos, books and paintings, at Ramakrishna Mission
 1964 – Opening Ceremony of the Singapore Association for the Blind (Fun Fair), at Great World Park
 1964 – Opening of the Assembly Hall, at St John Headquarters
 1964 – Declares open to 15th Annual Art Exhibition, at Victoria Memorial Hall
 1964 – Declares open painting class by the Malay Youth Artists group, at Kampong Melayu Boys' School
 1965 – Opening of the Exhibition in conjunction with Anti-Leprosy Campaign, at Victoria Memorial Hall
 1965 – Opening of the Exhibition of Paintings By Six Artists, at Victoria Memorial Hall
 1965 – Opening of the National Language Month, at Singapore Conference Hall
 1966 – Opening of the National Language Book Show, at Victoria Memorial Hall
 1967 – Declares open to Singapore Grand Prix, at Thomson Road
 1967 – Declares open to 3rd Annual Al-Qur'an Reading Competition, at Geylang Serai Vocational School
 1969 – Opening of the Singapore Grand Prix 1969, at Thomson Road
 1970 – Opening of the Singapore Grand Prix 1970 circuit, at Thomson Road

And also his wife Toh Puan Dr Noor Aishah officiated many events including:
 1960 – Declares open to Family Planning Exhibition, at Victoria Memorial Hall, by his wife Toh Puan Dr Noor Aishah
 1960 – Declares open to Art of Japanese Floral Arrangement Exhibition, in St Andrew's Mission Hospital, by his wife Toh Puan Dr Noor Aishah
 1961 – Declares open to 'Sale of Work', Cheshire Home, at Telok Paku, by his wife Toh Puan Dr Noor Aishah
 1961 – Declares open to The Flower Arrangement Demonstration Show, at National Library of Singapore, by his wife Toh Puan Dr Noor Aishah
 1961 – Declares open to 'Sale of Work' and exhibition of Social Welfare Department, at Victoria Memorial Hall, by his wife Toh Puan Dr Noor Aishah
 1963 – Opening of the Mammoth Exhibition and Sale-of-Work, at Victoria Memorial Hall, by his wife Toh Puan Dr Noor Aishah
 1963 – Singapore Amateur Athletic Association Open Championship, at Farrer Park, by his wife Toh Puan Dr Noor Aishah
 1964 – Declares open to 'Annual Sale of Work' for Tan Tock Seng Hospital, by his wife Toh Puan Dr Noor Aishah
 1964 – Opening of the Ngee Ann College Exhibition, by his wife Toh Puan Dr Noor Aishah
 1964 – Opening of the Flower Arranging and Sewing Exhibition, at Telok Kurau Malay School, by his wife Toh Puan Dr Noor Aishah
 1965 – Commence of the Red Cross fun fair at Raffles Institution, by his wife Toh Puan Dr Noor Aishah
 1965 – Declares open to Siglap Children's Festival, at St Patrick's School, by his wife Toh Puan Dr Noor Aishah
 1965 – Opening of the Social Welfare Homes' Sale of Works, at Victoria Memorial Hall, by his wife Toh Puan Dr Noor Aishah
 1965 – Opening of the Christmas Fair, at Victoria Memorial Hall, by his wife Toh Puan Dr Noor Aishah
 1966 – Declares open to Girl Guides' fun fair, at Anthony Road Girls' School, by his wife Toh Puan Dr Noor Aishah
 1967 – Declares open to Social Welfare Annual Sale of Work, at Victoria Memorial Hall, by his wife Toh Puan Dr Noor Aishah
 1969 – Declares open to Raffles Institution "Ang Pow '69" carnival, at Bras Basah Road, by his wife Toh Puan Dr Noor Aishah
 1970 – Young Women Muslim Association handicraft exhibition, at Haigsville Drive, by his wife Toh Puan Dr Noor Aishah
 1970 – Opening of the National Safety First Council of Singapore's Home Safety Exhibition, at Singapore Conference Hall, by his wife Toh Puan Dr Noor Aishah
 1970 – Opening of the Singapore Sogetsu Association's fifth annual floral exhibition, at Singapore Conference Hall, by his wife Toh Puan Dr Noor Aishah

Yusof Ishak also opened schools and institutions including:

 1960 – National Library of Singapore
 1960 – Community Centre, at Pulau Seraya
 1960 – Spastic Children's Association
 1960 – Scouts Golden Jubilee Camp, at Jurong
 1960 – Scouts Jubilee Camp, at Telok Paku
 1961 – Malayan Orchid Society
 1962 – Uttamram Chest Clinic, Singapore Anti-Tuberculosis Association (SATA)
 1962 – Masjid Tentera Di-Raja (Military Mosque)
 1963 – The National Theatre of Singapore (Panggong Negara), at Clemenceau Avenue
 1963 – Masjid Malabar (for Indian-Muslim communities)
 1964 – Singapore Association for the Blind
 1964 – Bank Negara's Singapore branch, at Empress Place
 1966 – Masjid Al-Abdul Razak, at Jalan Ismail

And also that of his wife Toh Puan Dr Noor Aishah including:
 1960 – Girl Guides' Golden Jubilee Camp, at Jurong Park, by his wife Toh Puan Dr Noor Aishah
 1960 – Young Muslim Women Association, by his wife Toh Puan Dr Noor Aishah
 1962 – Singapore Children's Society Convalescent Home, by his wife Toh Puan Dr Noor Aishah
 1963 – Singapore School for the Deaf, by his wife Toh Puan Dr Noor Aishah
 1967 – Young Women Muslim Association', at Haigsville Drive, by his wife Toh Puan Dr Noor Aishah
 1968 – Park Road Creche (Day Care Center), by his wife Toh Puan Dr Noor Aishah
 1968 – Toa Payoh Girls' Home, by his wife Toh Puan Dr Noor Aishah
 1969 – Singapore Association for Retarded Children's Lee Kong Chian Centre, at Margaret Drive, by his wife Toh Puan Dr Noor Aishah
 1970 – Young Women's Christian Association (YWCA) hostel, at Fort Canning, by his wife Toh Puan Dr Noor Aishah

Other achievements:
 1932 - Boxing Champion, winning the Aw Boon Par cup 1932
 1933 - Weightlifting Champion, National Lightweight category

Titles and styles

10 August 19103 September 1959: Inche Yusof bin Ishak
3 December 195916 September 1963: Paduka Yang Mulia Yang di-Pertuan Negara, Inche Yusof bin Ishak
16 September 19639 August 1965: Tuan Yang Terutama Yang di-Pertua Negeri, Tun Yusof bin Ishak
9 August 196523 November 1970:  His Excellency, President of the Republic, Inche Yusof bin Ishak

Honours

Honours of Singapore
  Darjah Utama Temasek, 1st Class
  Sijil Kemuliaan, 1st Class
  Darjah Utama Bakti Cemerlang, 1st Class
  Pingat Jasa Gemilang, 1st Class
 Hon. Doctor of Letters, (National University of Singapore)

Foreign Honours
  Seri Maharaja Mangku Negara (Malaysia)
  Pingat Kemahkotaan 1961 (Selangor)
  Darjah Kerabat Laila Utama Yang Amat Dihormati (Brunei), 1st Class
  Knight of the Order of St John (United Kingdom)

See also
Yusof Ishak Secondary School – a Secondary School in Singapore named in his honour.
Masjid Yusof Ishak – a mosque located in Woodlands named in his honour.

References

Notes

 

Presidents of Singapore
Singaporean people of Minangkabau descent
Singaporean people of Malay descent
Singaporean people of Indonesian descent
Minangkabau people
Singaporean Muslims
Victoria School, Singapore alumni
Raffles Institution alumni
1910 births
1970 deaths
Malaysian emigrants to Singapore
Recipients of the Darjah Utama Temasek